Pakistan participated at the 2017 Summer Universiade which was held in Taipei, Taiwan.

Pakistan sent a delegation consisting of 22 competitors for the event competing in 5 sporting events. Pakistan did not win any medals at the multi-sport event.

Participants

References 

2017 in Pakistani sport
Nations at the 2017 Summer Universiade